Ladislaus Adalbert Simacek (20 November 1913 – 19 March 2004) was an Austrian steeplechase runner. He competed in the men's 3000 metres steeplechase at the 1936 Summer Olympics.

References

External links
 

1913 births
2004 deaths
Athletes (track and field) at the 1936 Summer Olympics
Austrian male steeplechase runners
Olympic athletes of Austria
Athletes from Vienna